Belyanka is a rural locality (a selo) and the administrative center of Belyanskoye Rural Settlement, Shebekinsky District, Belgorod Oblast, Russia. The population was 1,666 as of 2010. There are 10 streets.

Geography 
Belyanka is located 29 km northeast of Shebekino (the district's administrative centre) by road. Zimovenka is the nearest rural locality.

References 

Rural localities in Shebekinsky District